James Cerretani and Travis Rettenmaier were the defending champions, but Rettenmaier decided not to participate this year.
Cerretani partnered up with Adil Shamasdin and they reached the final, where they lost to Robin Haase and Rogier Wassen 6–7(14), 5–7.

Seeds

Draw

Draw

References
 Doubles Draw

Zucchetti Kos Tennis Cup - Doubles
Internazionali di Tennis del Friuli Venezia Giulia
Zucchetti